Ngāti Pūkenga ki Waiau is a Māori iwi of New Zealand.

Hapū and marae
Ngāti Pūkenga ki Waiau has three hapū (sub-tribes): Ngāti Kiorekino, Ngāti Te Rākau and Te Tāwera.

The tribe's marae (traditional meeting ground) is Manaia Marae on Marae Road.

It marae includes Te Kou o Rehua, a wharenui (traditional meeting house) where official events are held.

References

See also
List of Māori iwi